Alexander Bandl (born 4 January 1944) is an Austrian former footballer who played as a midfielder.

Career 
Bandl played in the Eastern Canada Professional Soccer League in 1963 with Montreal Cantalia. The following season he signed with league rivals Montreal Italia. He played with Montreal in the 1965 season, and 1966 season. In 1965, he also played in the German-American Soccer League where he was named to the All-Star team.

In 1967, he played in the North American Soccer League with the New York Generals. The following season he was traded to the Dallas Tornado. In 1968, he played in the Mexican Primera División with Atlante F.C. He returned to Austria in 1969 to play with SK VOEST Linz in the Austrian Nationalliga. In 1973, he returned to former club Montreal Cantalia to play in the National Soccer League. He was later traded to Toronto Italia in late 1973.

References  

Living people
1944 births
Association football midfielders
Austrian footballers
New York Generals players
Dallas Tornado players
Atlante F.C. footballers
FC Linz players
Toronto Italia players
Eastern Canada Professional Soccer League players
German-American Soccer League players
North American Soccer League (1968–1984) players
Liga MX players
Austrian Football Bundesliga players
Canadian National Soccer League players
Footballers from Vienna
Austrian expatriate footballers
Austrian expatriate sportspeople in Canada
Austrian expatriate sportspeople in Mexico
Austrian expatriate sportspeople in the United States
Expatriate soccer players in Canada
Expatriate footballers in Mexico
Expatriate soccer players in the United States